Swampy Plain River (and in some places Swampy Plains River), a perennial stream that is part of the Murray catchment within the Murray–Darling basin, is located in the Snowy Mountains bioregion of New South Wales, Australia.

Course and features
From its headwaters, the river flows generally south, north and north west, joined by nine tributaries including the Geehi River, before reaching its confluence with the Murray River, near Khancoban, upstream from the Bringenbrong Bridge; descending  over its  course.

Swampy Plain River is impounded by Lake Cootapatamba close to its source, and by Khancoban Dam, close to its mouth. Located immediately upstream of the Khancoban Reservoir is the Murray-2 Power Station, a  conventional hydroelectric power station. Water from the power plant is discharged into the reservoir, before passing over the spillway of Khancoban Dam, and down the Swampy Plain River.

The river passes near the towns of Geehi and Khancoban.

The river is a popular place for fly fishing, with a significant stock of brown and rainbow trout.

The historic and iconic Hannel's Spur Track leads up from a signed trailhead near the Swampy Plains River to the very summit of Mount Kosciusko.  The trailhead is near the confluence of the Swampy Plains River and the Geehi River – this is the overlooked 3rd route to the summit of Australia's highest mountain. (Difficult)

See also

 Rivers of New South Wales
 Rivers of Australia
 Snowy Mountains Scheme

References

External links
 

Rivers of New South Wales
Tributaries of the Murray River
Snowy Mountains
Snowy Mountains Scheme
Snowy Valleys Council